Slaviša is a South Slavic masculine given name, an old Slavic origin given name derived from word "slav" - glory.

This name may refer to:

Slaviša Čula, Serbian football player
Slaviša Jokanović, Serbian football player
Slaviša Dugić, Swiss football player
Slaviša Dvorančič, Slovenian football player
Slaviša Koprivica, Serbian basketball player
Slaviša Mitrović, Bosnian football player
Slaviša Stojanović, Serbian football player
Slaviša Vukićević, Bosnian football player
Slaviša Žungul, Yugoslavian-American football player

Slavic masculine given names
Serbian masculine given names